Beginning in 1955, the Kingdom of Laos was divided into five Military Regions (MR), roughly corresponding to the areas of the country's 13 provinces.  The Military Regions were necessitated by the poor lines of communication within the country. The Military Districts were the basis of a culture of warlordism in the Royal Lao Armed Forces (FAR) high command, with most MR Commanders running their zones like private fiefdoms.

Overall view

Laos covers approximately 235,000 square kilometers (91,000 square miles). In the early 1950s, there were few means of transportation available in the Kingdom of Laos. Travelling by riverboat through the Mekong River was still the most reliable means of transporting people and goods in-country. Laos, newly independent from the French, had bequeathed fewer than 1,500 kilometers of all-weather paved roads. The purpose of the French colonial roadbuilding program had not been the interconnection of Laos' provinces, but rather linkage with Vietnam. Air transportation in Laos depended on half a dozen airports and auxiliary airfields that could not accommodate anything larger than twin-engine aircraft. With such barely developed transport infrastructure, the defense of the country was entrusted to local troops raised in and stationed at military districts reflecting French traditions, designated "Military Regions" (French: Régions Militaires), which encompassed two or more provinces. As a result of this decentralized organization, the FAR General Staff in Vientiane served primarily an administrative function, exerting little control over the regional commands and local commanders were free to adjust their tactics to the local situation. Consequently, Laotian commanders of the Military Regions became warlords within their regions. A top command position within a Military Region was dependent upon the influence of an urban elite aristocratic family or families who economically and politically dominated the MR. If a general was not a scion of one of these families, then he had their support in some other manner.

Military Region 1
The provinces of Military Region 1 (French: Région Militaire 1) are listed and mapped below. Headquartered at Luang Prabang the MR 1 was the largest, covering the whole of North-western Laos. The region was dominated by the Lao Royal family and the former Commander-in-Chief of the Royal Lao Army, Major-General Ouane Rattikone. Its original appointee to command it in 1955 was Major (later, General) Ouane Rattikone. In late 1962, the MR 1 was commanded by Colonel (later, Brigadier-General) Sourith Don Sasorith, later replaced by Brigadier-General Tiao Sayvong, a half-brother of the King.

Military Region 2
The provinces of Military Region 2 (French: Région Militaire 2) are mapped and listed below. Initially headquartered at Vientiane and later at Long Tieng northwest of the Plain of Jars in the Xiangkhoang Province, the MR 2 covered the North-eastern Laos. Its original military commander in 1955 was Major (later, General) Sang Kittirath, replaced in mid-1962 by Colonel Khamkong Bouddavong. It was later placed under the command of Major-General Vang Pao, the Hmong (Meo) guerrilla war hero of Laos.

Military Region 3
The provinces of Military Region 3 (French: Région Militaire 3) are mapped and listed below. Headquartered at Savannakhet, capital of Savannakhet Province, the MR 3 covered the Upper Laotian Panhandle in central Laos. Its original commanding officer in 1955 was Major (later, General) Sing Rattanasamy. In late 1962, this region was commanded by Colonel Lam Ngeum, replaced on 1 July 1971 by Colonel (later, Brigadier-General) Nouphet Daoheuang. The real power in this Region was in the hands of the Insixiengmay family led by Royal Lao Government Minister Leuam Insixiengmay, Vice-Premier and Minister of Education (his wife was the elder sister of Mom bouanphan, herself the wife of Prince Boun Oum Na Champassak).

Military Region 4
The provinces of Military Region 4 (French: Région Militaire 4) are mapped and listed below. Headquartered at Pakse, capital of Champassak Province, the MR 4 covered the Lower Laotian Panhandle comprising the six provinces of southern Laos. It was dominated by the Nachampassak family led by Prince Boun Oum Na Champassak. Its original commander in 1955 was Major (later, General) Amkha Soukhavong, succeeded in late 1962 by Colonel (later, Major-General) Phasouk Somly Rasaphak, himself a member of the Champassak family, who held the command of this area for almost a decade and a half until 1 July 1971, when he was replaced by Brigadier-General Soutchay Vongsavanh.

Military Region 5
Military Region 5 (French: Région Militaire 5) was formed in Summer 1959. Headquartered at Camp Chinaimo, a major Army facility located on the eastern outskirts of Vientiane, the MR 5 covered the Capital zone – which included the nation's central government seat and the namesake Vientiane province – and the Borikhane province. Its first commanding officer was Major-General Phoumi Nosavan, succeeded in early 1960 by Major-General Kouprasith Abhay until he was replaced on 1 July 1971 by Brigadier-General Thongligh Chokbengboun.

Military Region 6
In early 1962 Sainyabuli Province was removed from Military Region 1, and designated as MR 6. It was returned to MR 1 in July 1968. In late 1962, the MR 6 was commanded by Colonel Houmphanh Norasing.

Military Region 7
In early 1962 Champasak Province was removed from Military Region 4, and designated as MR 7. It was returned to MR 4 in July 1968. In late 1962, the MR 7 was commanded by Colonel Kot Venevongsos.

See also

 Army of the Republic of Vietnam (ARVN)
 Air America
 Hmong people
 North Vietnamese invasion of Laos
 Pathet Lao
 Khmer National Armed Forces
 Laotian Civil War
 Royal Lao Air Force
 Royal Lao Armed Forces
 Royal Lao Army Airborne
 Royal Lao Police
 Vietnam War
 Weapons of the Laotian Civil War

Endnotes

References
 Bernard Fall, Anatomy of a Crisis: The Laotian Crisis of 1960–1961, Doubleday & Co, New York 1969. ASIN: B00JKPAJI4
 Victor B. Anthony and Richard R. Sexton, The War in Northern Laos, Command for Air Force History, 1993. 
 Kenneth Conboy and Simon McCouaig, The War in Laos 1960-75, Men-at-arms series 217, Osprey Publishing Ltd, London 1989. 
 Kenneth Conboy and Don Greer, War in Laos 1954–1975, Carrollton, TX: Squadron/Signal Publications, 1994. 
 Kenneth Conboy with James Morrison, Shadow War: The CIA's Secret War in Laos, Paladin Press, 1995.

External links
Country Study - Kingdom of Laos

Military units and formations of Laos
Laotian Civil War
Laos